Albert Uustulnd (6 November 1925 in Suure-Rootsi – 9 August 1997 Kuressaare) was an Estonian writer and playwright.

In 1954, he graduated from Tallinn University of Technology in economics. After graduating he worked as a fisherman, later also as a building site foreman.

He died in 1997 and he is buried at Kudjape Cemetery, near Kuressaare.

Works
 novel "Meri põleb" (1969)
 novel "Avali väraval" (1977)
 novel "Meri, mehed ja jumalad" (1980)
 novel "Tuulte tallermaa" I part (1985); II part (1990)
 novel "Lambeti graafik" (1987)
 novel "Acheroni kaldal" (1991)
 novel "Lummav meri" (1994)
 novel "Rajud ei rauge" (1994)
 novel "Kui jumalad nutsid" (1995)
 novel "Hullunud meri" (1996)
 novel "Tormid ei taltu" (1996)
 novel "Rannavälja" (1997)
 novel "Ohtlikud hoovused" (1998)

References

1925 births
1997 deaths
Estonian male novelists
Estonian dramatists and playwrights
Tallinn University of Technology alumni
People from Saaremaa Parish